Robert Colin David Stewart (June 25, 1926 – August 13, 1994), commonly known as Colin Stewart, was a Canadian politician. He represented the electoral district of Colchester South in the Nova Scotia House of Assembly from 1978 to 1993. He was a member of the Nova Scotia Progressive Conservative Party.

Stewart was born at Greenvale in Pictou County, Nova Scotia in 1926. He attended Acadia University and Dalhousie University and earned Bachelor of Science and Doctor of Medicine (M.D.) degrees, later practicing as a physician. Stewart is also a former mayor of Stewiacke, Nova Scotia. He was married to Pearl Campbell. He died on August 13, 1994 at the Halifax Infirmary, aged 68.

References

1926 births
1994 deaths
Acadia University alumni
Dalhousie University alumni
Mayors of places in Nova Scotia
Progressive Conservative Association of Nova Scotia MLAs
Members of the Executive Council of Nova Scotia
People from Colchester County
People from Pictou County